Cookers is an American horror film directed by Dan Mintz which was released in 2001.  The film is about two drug users who hide out in an abandoned farmhouse to prepare a huge batch of crystal meth, only to be tormented by terrifying visions.

Synopsis 
After having stealing the precursor chemicals needed to illicitly produce crystal meth from bikers, a young couple decides to set up a temporary drug lab and make a large batch of the drug, in hopes of making a large profit. The man is a meth addict with extensive experience taking the drug; his girlfriend is an expert in illegal drug preparation. On the advice of friends, they set up their production in an old abandoned house in the middle of a forest. However, they cannot prepare the drug without trying some of it. The couple are already stressed about the risk of being found by the bikers thet stole the raw drug materials from, so taking meth only increases their anxiety.

The two drug-makers, nicknamed "cookers" in drug subculture slang, end up getting increasingly paranoid in the dark, isolated house. When a friend (who visits to bring supplies) tells them an urban legend about a horrible murder of a little girl in the old house, the couple gets increasingly afraid. While taking meth, the couple think that they might be seeing glimpses of the dead girl; or it might just be paranoia and drug-fuelled hallucinations. Is there really a ghostly presence in the house, or are the pair just tripping on their newly-cooked drugs?

Technical details 

 Director: Dan Mintz
 Script: Jack Moore and Jeff Ritchie
 Production : Jeff Ritchie and Wu Bing
 Production : Pacesetter Productions International
 Music: Billy White Acre and Ennio Di Berardo
 Photography : Dan Mintz
 Editing: Jim May and Dan Mintz
 Scenery : Mara A. Spear
 Costumes : Mandi Line
 Country of production  : United States
 Format : Color – 1,85:1 – Dolby Digital – 35 mm
 Genre : Drama, horror
 Length: 96 minutes
 Release  : April 23, 2001 (Los Angeles Festival), February 25, 2005 (US)

Cast 

 Brad Hunt : Hector
 Cyia Batten : Dorena
 Patrick McGaw : Merle
 Frankie Ray : Father

Production 

 It was shot in Oxnard, in California.
 It was director Dan Mintz's first film. Mintz worked with Jack Moore and Jeff Ritchie again in 2004 on American Crime.

Awards 

 Prizes for best film, best photography, best editing and best music at the Festival international du film de Milan 2001.

External links 

 

American drama films
American horror films
2001 films
Films shot in California
2000s American films